Olga Pelekanou (born 23 May 1981) is a Greek former synchronized swimmer who competed in the 2004 Summer Olympics.

References

1981 births
Living people
Greek synchronized swimmers
Olympic synchronized swimmers of Greece
Synchronized swimmers at the 2004 Summer Olympics